Leroy DeLeon is a retired Trinidad and Tobago football striker who played in the North American Soccer League and Major Indoor Soccer League.

DeLeon graduated from Saint Benedict's College.  In 1967, he signed with the New York Generals of the National Professional Soccer League.  In 1968, the NPSL merged with the United Soccer Association to form the North American Soccer League.  DeLeon and the Generals spent the 1968 season in the NASL. In 1969, DeLeon moved to the Washington Darts, then in the American Soccer League.  He was a 1970 First Team All Star in the NASL.  Following the 1971 season, the Darts moved to Miami, Florida and became the Miami Gatos.  DeLeon did not play in the NASL in 1972.  In May 1974, Miami (now renamed the Toros) traded DeLeon to the Washington Diplomats for cash and the Diplomats 1974 first round draft choice.  In April 1977, the Diplomats traded DeLeon to the San Jose Earthquakes in exchange for Mark Liveric.   He finished his NASL career in 1979 with the Seattle Sounders.  In the fall of 1979, DeLeon moved to the Detroit Lightning of the Major Indoor Soccer League.  The Lightning traded him to the Phoenix Inferno where he retired after three seasons.

He also played at international level for Trinidad and Tobago. His son is fellow player Nick DeLeon.

In 2008, he was inducted into the Trinidad and Tobago Sports Hall of Fame.

References

External links
 NASL career stats

1948 births
Living people
American Soccer League (1933–1983) players
Detroit Lightning players
Expatriate soccer players in the United States
Major Indoor Soccer League (1978–1992) players
National Professional Soccer League (1967) players
New York Generals (NPSL) players
New York Generals players
North American Soccer League (1968–1984) players
North American Soccer League (1968–1984) indoor players
Phoenix Inferno players
San Jose Earthquakes (1974–1988) players
Seattle Sounders (1974–1983) players
Sportspeople from Port of Spain
TT Pro League managers
Trinidad and Tobago footballers
Trinidad and Tobago expatriate footballers
Trinidad and Tobago international footballers
Trinidad and Tobago expatriate sportspeople in the United States
Washington Diplomats (NASL) players
Washington Darts players
Miami Toros players
Association football forwards
Trinidad and Tobago football managers